Providence Plantation and Farm, also known as Fogg House and Farm, is a historic plantation house located near Newtown, King and Queen County, Virginia.  The main was built about 1826, and altered about 1840.  It is a two-story, three bay, brick house with Federal style design influences. Also on the property are the contributing two-story Reconstruction-era granary and carriage house, and Great Depression-era hen laying house, two-story sweet potato shed, and mechanic's shop.

It was listed on the National Register of Historic Places in 2009.

References

Plantation houses in Virginia
Houses on the National Register of Historic Places in Virginia
Federal architecture in Virginia
Houses completed in 1826
Houses in King and Queen County, Virginia
National Register of Historic Places in King and Queen County, Virginia
1826 establishments in Virginia